Dawson is an unincorporated community in Shelby County, in the U.S. state of Ohio.

History
A post office was established at Dawson in 1883, and remained in operation until it was discontinued in 1928. A station on the New York Central Railroad, a variant name was Patrick Station.

References

Unincorporated communities in Shelby County, Ohio
Unincorporated communities in Ohio